Falls Township is the name of two places in the U.S. state of Pennsylvania:
Falls Township, Bucks County, Pennsylvania
Falls Township, Wyoming County, Pennsylvania

Pennsylvania township disambiguation pages